Gao Yang (born 5 September 2004) is a Chinese former professional snooker player.

Career 
Gao Yang started playing on the Chinese tour aged just 13, and was quickly accepted by the CBSA Academy. He played in the ACBS Asian Under-21 Snooker Championship in 2018 and 2019, the IBSF World Under-21 Snooker Championship and IBSF World Under-18 Snooker Championship also in 2018 and 2019. His only real success came in the 2019 IBSF World Under-18 Snooker Championship, where he reached the final, losing 5–2 to the 13-year old Jiang Jun.

His first taste of professional snooker came at the 2019 World Open, where he was a wildcard. Originally Gao's coach Ju Reti had qualified, but gave up his place in order to allow his pupil to gain experience. Gao lost the match 5–1 to Lu Ning.

In January 2020 Gao won the WSF Junior Open, an under-18 tournament. He beat heralded juniors Ben Mertens, Dean Young and Wu Yize, before overcoming Sean Maddocks 5–2 in the final. As a result, he was awarded a two-year card on the World Snooker Tour for the 2020–21 and 2021–22. Even though just 15 years old, he stated that he intended to take up his professional tour card. He thus became the second professional snooker player from Anhui, after his mentor Niu Zhuang.

2020/2021 season 
As it happened, Gao turned 16 before the start of the 2020–21 season, which was delayed due to COVID-19. His first tournament was the Championship League. Gao made 2-2 draws against Ben Woollaston and Si Jiahui, but lost 3–1 to Matt Selt. He finished his first day as a professional 3rd in the 4-player group but had made two century breaks.

In subsequent tournaments Gao had wins against Zhao Jianbo, Kacper Filipiak, Mitchell Mann and Duane Jones. In the Northern Ireland Open Gao lost 4–0 to World No.1 Judd Trump, who had breaks of 109, 127 and a maximum 147. In the World Championship, Gao beat experienced player Paul Davison 6-3 and played very well against Lyu Haotian to lead 5–3. But his more experienced compatriot won the last 3 frames to edge the match 6–5. Gao finished his debut season ranked 107.

Style 
Gao is known as an attacking left-hander. Unusually, he can play with either hand with the rest: with his left-hand he plays underarm in a manner pioneered by the Thai player Sunny Akani.

Personal life 
During the season, Gao Yang lives in Sheffield where he practices at the Ding Junhui Snooker Academy.

Performance and rankings timeline

Career finals

Amateur finals: 2 (1 title)

References

Living people
Chinese snooker players
2004 births
21st-century Chinese people